A referendum on dissolving the union with Sweden was held in Norway on 13 August 1905. Dissolving the union, which had been in place since 1814, was approved by almost 100% of voters, with just 184 voting against the proposal out of over 371,000 votes cast.

Background
On 27 May 1905 the Storting passed a bill supported by the government of Christian Michelsen calling for the establishment of separate Norwegian consulates. Under the terms of the union, Norway and Sweden shared a common foreign policy. King Oscar II vetoed the bill. Rather than countersign it as the King demanded, the government resigned. Oscar refused to accept the resignations, claiming he could not form a replacement government. 

On 7 June, the Storting declared the union dissolved on the grounds that Oscar had effectively abandoned his functions as King of Norway by failing to appoint a new government. The Swedish government was prepared to dissolve the union, provided that the Norwegian people agree to it in a referendum.

The question put to the voters (only men had suffrage in Norway at the time) was whether they approved of the "already completed dissolution of the union" («den stedfundne Opløsning af Unionen»). The wording of the question was carefully considered to make it clear that the Storting considered the union to be out of force even if the Swedish government insisted that it could be dissolved only upon mutual consent.

The Storting announced the referendum on 27 July, in anticipation of the Swedish demands, thereby avoiding the appearance that it had been scheduled in response to demands from Stockholm.

Although women did not have a vote, Norwegian suffragists started a campaign to collect signatures in favor of the dissolution and were able to present 244,765 signatures in favor of the dissolution within two weeks.

Results

Aftermath
The referendum was followed by negotiations in Karlstad. The two countries reached an agreement on 23 September, which was approved by the Norwegian and Swedish parliaments on 9 October and 13 October, respectively. Oscar gave up all claims to the Norwegian throne on 26 October. In November, Prince Carl of Denmark was elected as Norway's first independent king in over five centuries, assuming the throne as Haakon VII.

See also
Dissolution of the union between Norway and Sweden
1905 Norwegian monarchy referendum

References

Norway
Political history of Norway
Referendums in Norway
Norway
1905 in Norway
1905 in international relations
August 1905 events